The Williamsport Outlaws were a professional ice hockey team in the Federal Hockey League. The team played the 2011-2012 season in Wayne, New Jersey as the New Jersey Outlaws. Following winning the FHL championship in 2012, the Outlaws announced they would move to Williamsport, Pennsylvania and play all of their games outdoors at Bowman Field while awaiting the completion of an arena in Williamsport.

The Outlaws were the FHL affiliate of the ECHL's Elmira Jackals.

The Outlaws ceased operations on January 21, 2013 after the team owner refused to play the remaining road games. The team was later rebranded as the Pennsylvania Blues on February 8, 2013 after the FHL took over control of the team and used the Blues as a traveling team to fill the schedule for the remainder of the season.

Season-by-season record

References

External links
Williamsport Outlaws website
Federal Hockey League website

Federal Prospects Hockey League teams
Ice hockey teams in Pennsylvania
Ice hockey clubs established in 2011
Sports in Williamsport, Pennsylvania
2011 establishments in Pennsylvania
2013 disestablishments in Pennsylvania
Ice hockey clubs disestablished in 2013